Ornduffia marchantii is a species of plant in the Menyanthaceae family of wetland plants that is endemic to Western Australia.

Distribution and habitat
The species occurs in the Jarrah Forest IBRA bioregion of Southwest Australia. There, its distribution is limited to the Porongurup Range, where it occurs in disturbed habitats in Karri forest on wet loamy soils.

References

marchantii
Asterales of Australia
Eudicots of Western Australia
Taxa named by Robert Ornduff
Plants described in 1990